Lord Hailes may refer to:

David Dalrymple, Lord Hailes (1726–1792), Scottish advocate, judge and historian
Patrick Buchan-Hepburn, 1st Baron Hailes (1901–1974), Scottish Conservative politician
Patrick Hepburn, 1st Lord Hailes (d. 1483), Scottish Lord of Parliament